Yamanishi is a Japanese surname. Notable people with the surname include:

, Japanese actor
, Japanese footballer
, Japanese racewalker

See also
8097 Yamanishi, a main-belt asteroid
Yamanashi Prefecture, a prefecture in the Chūbu region of Honshu, Japan

Japanese-language surnames